In 3D computer graphics and modeling, volumetric meshes are a polygonal representation of the interior volume of an object. Unlike polygon meshes, which represent only the surface as polygons, volumetric meshes also discretize the interior structure of the object.

Applications 

One application of volumetric meshes is in finite element analysis, which may use regular or irregular volumetric meshes to compute internal stresses and forces in an object throughout the entire volume of the object. 

Volume meshes may also be used for portal rendering.

See also 

 B-rep
 Voxels
 Hypergraph
 Volume rendering

References

3D computer graphics
Computer graphics data structures
Mesh generation